Free Rein is a British drama television series created and written by Vicki Lutas and Anna McCleery. 
It stars Jaylen Barron, Navia Robinson (seasons 1-2) and Freddy Carter.
Produced in the UK by Lime Pictures, the ten-part first series premiered on Netflix on 23 June 2017. Although the island where the series is set is fictional and unnamed, it is based on Anglesey, Wales and is referred to as "an island off the coast of England" throughout the programme. The second series premiered on 6 July 2018. Shortly afterwards, Free Rein was renewed for a third series, as well as two feature-length special episodes. Free Rein: The 12 Neighs of Christmas, premiered on 7 December 2018. The second special, Free Rein: Valentine’s Day, premiered on 1 February 2019. The third series, consisting of 10 episodes, premiered on 6 July 2019. In January 2021, cast member Céline Buckens confirmed that the series had concluded.

Cast and characters

Main
 Jaylen Barron as Zoe Phillips, a 15-year-old girl from Los Angeles, US who spends the summer in her mother's hometown in the United Kingdom, where she develops a kinship with a horse named Raven (the wildest in the stables and foal of Ruby Dawn). Zoe immediately becomes friends with Jade and Becky upon arriving at Bright Fields.
 Freddy Carter as Peter "Pin" Hawthorne, a stable boy and son of Ted. In series two, it is revealed that he is a duke and inherits a fortune, which he uses to buy Raven and Bright Fields Stables. He has a horse named Elvis. One of the boys who has a crush on Zoe.
 Navia Robinson as Rosie Phillips, Zoe's younger sister who has difficulty adjusting to the United Kingdom and stable life, but becomes friends with Ben. At the end of series two, she goes back to Los Angeles with Maggie. (series 1–2)
 Manpreet Bambra as Jade Gill, Zoe and Becky's best friend who rides at Bright Fields. In series three, she receives an honorary letter from David Attenborough after her successful horse project.
 Kerry Ingram as Rebecca "Becky" Sidebottom, Zoe and Jade's best friend who rides at Bright Fields, and Ben's older sister. She works part-time at The Barley Bag Cafe. Becky and her brother own a black and white Pinto Gypsy horse named Bob. In series three, she begins a horse club called The Breakfast Club, composed of Aaron, Winnie and Heather. For this, she receives a medal due to the contributions they made to the safety of the wild horses.
 Bruce Herbelin-Earle as Marcus Greenbridge, a well-liked rider and trainer at Bright Fields. He is Sam's cousin. At the end of series one, he gets accepted into the academy; being the only person from the island to go. However, he later drops out. In series three, he receives his qualification to be a trainer. Marcus has a romantic history with Mia, who he begins a relationship with in the third series.
 Céline Buckens as Amelia "Mia" MacDonald, a girl whose father financially supported Bright Fields in series one and two. She and Zoe immediately clash, but after episode nine, Mia and Zoe became friends. Mia owns Firefly. In the third series, Mia is thrown from Firefly, after which she suffers from PTSD when around horses. Later that series, she discovers her father dumped building waste in the lake, which poisoned residents and wild horses, and helps bring him to justice. Mia has a romantic history with Marcus, who she begins a relationship with in the third series.
 Natalie Gumede as Margaret "Maggie" Steel-Phillips, Zoe and Rosie's mother. Maggie is a former equestrian, and as a child, she had a horse named Emerald. Maggie forbids Zoe from riding, but eventually started riding again to help her accept the fact that Zoe was going to ride. At the end of series two, she goes back to Los Angeles with Rosie. (series 1–2)
 Caroline Ford as Samantha "Sam" Myers, the owner of Bright Fields and one of the trainers. She is Marcus' cousin. However, it is revealed that she had been reluctantly working with the horse thieves who were trying to steal Raven in a desperate attempt to save Bright Fields from bankruptcy. (series 1)
 Noah Huntley (series 1–2) and Andrew Steele (series 3) as Elliot MacDonald, Mia's wealthy but often absent father. Elliot is a childhood friend of Maggie, and encourages Maggie to ride again. In the third series, Elliot goes to prison following dumping building waste in the lake.
 Geoffrey McGivern as Francis "Frank" Steel, Maggie's father and Zoe and Rosie's grandfather. In Free Rein: Twelve Neighs of Christmas, it is revealed that Frank has a long-lost brother, Owen, who Zoe reunites him with. 
 Carla Woodcock as Susie Garrett, Mia's best friend who is often bossed around by Mia. In series two, she began dating Callum, a rider at Holloway, but later finds out that he attempted to cheat on her with Mia. In the third series, Susie had a job at the council offices and has become far more independent of Mia's influence, even threatening to end their friendship if she does not help her and the stable.
 Charlotte Jordan as Gaby Grant, the sister of James and a girl with a tragic past. It is revealed in Free Rein: 12 Neighs of Christmas that Gaby is homeless, and Zoe finds out which leads Zoe to ask Gaby to move in with her. In the third series, she bonds with Ariel, a wild horse, but allows her to be free. Gaby earns a place on the Under 18s Riding Team following Callum's disqualification. (series 2–3)
 Martin Bobb-Semple as Alex, a friendly rider at Holloway and Becky's love interest and boyfriend. (series 2–3)
 Joe Ashman as Callum, Susie's ex-boyfriend and the bad boy of the neighbouring riding school. Susie broke up with him when Mia exposed him for attempting to cheat on Susie. In the third series, he helps Elliot to dump building waste in the local lake, in exchange for a place on the Under 18s Riding Team, which his father and brother have all been in. (series 2–3)
 Sadie Simm as Winnie, a girl who helps Becky out around Bright Fields. She is part of The Breakfast Club. (series 3)
 Seth Carr as Aaron Phillips, Zoe's cousin visiting from Los Angeles. His mother sends him to the Island in a final chance to prove he can be good before he sends him to boarding school. He is part of The Breakfast Club. (series 3)
 Sanchaez-Rain Li-Brown as Heather Wright, the daughter of Claire. She is part of The Breakfast Club, and owns a horse called Princess. (series 3)

Recurring
 Billy Angel as Benjamin "Ben" Sidebottom, Becky's younger brother, who befriends Rosie. (series 1–2)
 Milo Twomey as Edward "Ted" Hawthorne, Pin's father who has a past with Maggie, and buried her horse Emerald when he died. Ted wants Pin to stay away from Zoe, as he believes that she will hurt Pin.
 Holly Hayes as Meredith Moore, Raven's former owner. The final episode of series one reveals that Raven was stolen from Meredith as a foal. When Meredith shows up to legally take Raven home with her, he refuses to leave Bright Fields. After Zoe reasons with Meredith, she agrees to board Raven at Bright Fields. At the end of series two, it is revealed that Pin bought Raven from her, as a gift for Zoe. (series 1–2)
 Ryan Sands as Huck Phillips, Zoe and Rosie's father, Maggie's husband, and Frank's son-in-law, as well as the apparent brother-in-law of Aaron's mother. (series 1–2)
 Paul Luebke as Derek Wrigley, a police officer who comes to the stables occasionally and had a crush on Sam. (series 1)
 Tom Forbes as James, the former trainer at Bright Fields and the current trainer at rival riding school, Holloway. (series 2)
 T'Nia Miller as Claire Wright, the new mayor of the island. Upon arrival, Claire wants to hunt down the wild horses to capture them, but she is later made to protect them, after Jade confronts her while on a livestream. (series 3)
 Joe Sims as Geoff, the bodyguard and assistant of Claire. (series 3)
 Anna Passey as Felicity, a rider who examines Marcus on his test to be an instructor. She later appears as a judge in the tryouts for the Under 18s Riding Team. (series 3)
 Paul Antony-Barber as Arthur, the butler at the castle that the Hawthorne family own. (series 3)

Episodes

Series 1 (2017)

Series 2 (2018–2019)

Series 3 (2019)

Awards and nominations

References

External links
 
 

2017 British television series debuts
2019 British television series endings
2010s British children's television series
British teen drama television series
Netflix children's programming
English-language Netflix original programming
Television series about families
Television series about horses
Television series about sisters
Television series about teenagers
Television series by All3Media
Television shows set in the United Kingdom
Youth culture in the United Kingdom